Morghak-e Olya (also Romanized as Morghak-e ‘Olyā; also known as Marghak and Morghak) is a village in Deh Bakri Rural District, in the Central District of Bam County, Kerman Province, Iran. At the 2006 census, its population was 282, in 70 families.

References 

Populated places in Bam County